Gatine is a locality in Alberta, Canada.

The locality has the name of one Mrs. Gatine, a railroad employee.

References 

Localities in Kneehill County